WWDS (90.5 FM) was a high school radio station broadcasting a variety music format. Formerly licensed to Muncie, Indiana, United States, the radio station served the Muncie-Marion area. The station was owned by Delaware Community School Corp.

History
The station went on the air as WWDS-FM on May 3, 1979. However, a tape recording of this station testing prior to July 4, 1978, suggests that WWDS may have been on the air earlier. On July 18, 1979, the station's call sign was changed to WWDS.

On September 16, 2010, the station's license was cancelled by the Federal Communications Commission and its call sign deleted from its database.

References

External links

High school radio stations in the United States
WDS
Radio stations established in 1979
Defunct radio stations in the United States
Radio stations disestablished in 2010
1979 establishments in Indiana
2010 disestablishments in Indiana
WDS